Lanthus vernalis, the southern pygmy clubtail, is a species of clubtail in the family of dragonflies known as Gomphidae. It is found in eastern North America. One of the smallest of the clubtails, it is typically found near small, clear running trout streams. The larvae can live up to 5 years before emergence. 

The IUCN conservation status of Lanthus vernalis is "LC", least concern, with no immediate threat to the species' survival. The population is stable.

References

Further reading

 

Gomphidae
Articles created by Qbugbot
Insects described in 1980